Nodozana endoxantha is a moth of the subfamily Arctiinae. It was described by E. Dukinfield Jones in 1908. It is found in Paraná, Brazil.

References

Lithosiini
Moths described in 1900